Isopsephy (isos meaning "equal" and  psephos meaning "pebble") or isopsephism is the practice of adding up the number values of the letters in a word to form a single number. The total number is then used as a metaphorical bridge to other words evaluating the equal number, which satisfies isos or "equal" in the term. The early Greeks used pebbles arranged in patterns to learn arithmetic and geometry, which corresponds to psephos or "pebble" and "counting" in the term.

Isopsephy is related to gematria: the same practice using the Hebrew alphabet. It is also related to the ancient number systems of many other peoples (for the Arabic alphabet version, see Abjad numerals). A gematria of Latin script languages was also popular in Europe from the Middle Ages to the Renaissance, and its legacy remains in code-breaking, numerology, and Masonic symbolism today (see arithmancy).

History

Until Arabic numerals were adopted and adapted from Indian numerals in the 8th and 9th centuries AD, and promoted in Europe by Fibonacci of Pisa with his 1202 book Liber Abaci, numerals were predominantly alphabetical. For instance in Ancient Greece, Greek numerals used the alphabet. It is just a short step from using letters of the alphabet in everyday arithmetic and mathematics to seeing numbers in words, and to writing with an awareness of the numerical dimension of words.

An early reference to isopsephy, albeit of more-than-usual sophistication (employing multiplication rather than addition), is from the mathematician Apollonius of Perga, writing in the 3rd century BC. He asks: "Given the verse: , what does the product of all its elements equal?" More conventional are the instances of isopsephy found in graffiti at Pompeii, dating from around 79 AD. One reads  "" Another says, " "
Suetonius, writing in 121 AD, reports a political slogan that someone wrote on a wall in Rome: 

which appears to be another example. A famous example is 666 in the Biblical Book of Revelation (13:18): "Here is wisdom. Let him that hath understanding count the number of the beast: for it is the number of a man; and his number is Six hundred threescore and six." The word rendered "count", psephisato, has the same "pebble" root as the word isopsephy. The Greek Neron Kaisar (Nero Caesar in Latin/English) when transliterated into Hebrew gematria equals "six hundred sixty-six".  

Also in the 1st century AD, Leonidas of Alexandria created isopsephs, epigrams with equinumeral distichs, where the first hexameter and pentameter equal the next two verses in numerical value. He addressed some of them to Nero:

Which translates to: "The muse of Leonidas of the Nile offers up to thee, O Caesar, this writing, at the time of thy nativity; for the sacrifice of Calliope is always without smoke: but in the ensuing year he will offer up, if thou wilt, better things than this." Here the sum of both the first and second distich is 5699. In another of his distichs, the hexameter line is equal in number to its corresponding pentameter:

Which translates to: "One line is made equal in number to one, not two to two; for I no longer approve of long epigrams." Here each line totals 4111.

A headstone found at the Temple of Artemis at Sparta Orthia is a 2nd-century AD example of isopsephic elegiac verse. It says:

It is the votive stele for a boy who won a competition in singing. The words in each line add up to  that is 2730, and that total is also given at the end of each line. Also in the 2nd century AD, Aelius Nicon of Pergamon, the Greek architect and builder described by his son, the famous physician Galen, as having "mastered all there was to know of the science of geometry and numbers", was a master in composing isopsephic works.

Letter values of the Greek alphabet
In Greek, each unit (1, 2, ..., 9) was assigned a separate letter, each tens (10, 20, ..., 90) a separate letter, and each hundreds (100, 200, ..., 900) a separate letter. This requires 27 letters, so the 24-letter alphabet was extended by using three obsolete letters: digamma  (also used are stigma  or, in modern Greek) for 6, qoppa  for 90, and sampi  for 900.

This alphabetic system operates on the additive principle in which the numeric values of the letters are added together to form the total. For example, 241 is represented as σμα (200 + 40 + 1).

See also 
 About the Mystery of the Letters
 Chronogram
 English Qaballa
 Marcosians
 Sator Square
 Theomatics

Notes

References
The Greek Qabalah: Alphabetic Mysticism and Numerology in the Ancient World, Kieren Barry, Samuel Weiser, 1999.

External links
Greek Gematria/Isopsephia Calculator – Requires Flash 8 or greater – Also Accepts Unicode Greek letters and will add them up for you
Greek Isopsephia Line Calculator – Unicode – Flash not required

Greek words and phrases
Numerology
Language and mysticism